Danny Josue Vaca Figueroa (born May 12, 1990 in Quito) is an Ecuadorian footballer who plays for JIT.

Vaca played for LDU Quito in the 2008 FIFA Club World Cup.

References

External links
Vaca's FEF player card 

1990 births
Living people
Footballers from Quito
Association football forwards
Ecuadorian footballers
L.D.U. Quito footballers
C.D. Universidad Católica del Ecuador footballers
S.D. Aucas footballers